Attila Feri (born 24 September 1968 in Târgu Mureș) is a retired weightlifter who competed for Romania in  1992 Summer Olympics and later for Hungary and he won a Bronze medal in the 70 kg  in the  1996 Summer Olympics in Atlanta while competing for Hungary.

Major results

References 

Olympic weightlifters of Hungary
Olympic weightlifters of Romania
Weightlifters at the 2004 Summer Olympics
Weightlifters at the 1996 Summer Olympics
Weightlifters at the 1992 Summer Olympics
Olympic bronze medalists for Hungary
Olympic medalists in weightlifting
People from Târgu Mureș
Sportspeople from Târgu Mureș
1968 births
Living people
Medalists at the 1996 Summer Olympics
Romanian male weightlifters